Personal Business is the second solo studio album by American rapper Bad Azz from Long Beach, California. It was released on July 17, 2001 via Doggystyle Records and Priority Records. It features guest appearances from Blaqthoven, Busta Rhymes, Butch Cassidy, Doggy's Angels, Goldie Loc, Ice Cube, Jelly Roll, Kokane, LaToiya Williams, Lil' Beau, Lil' ½ Dead, Lil' Tip Toe, Mac Minister, Ras Kass, RBX, Salim Grant, Suga Free, Sylk-E. Fyne, Tha Dogg Pound and Val Young. The album peaked at #59Personal on the Billboard 200 and #16 on the Top R&B/Hip-Hop Albums charts in the United States.

Tracks listing

Sample credits
Track 10 contains elements from "Ain't We Funkin' Now" by The Brothers Johnson
Track 14 contains elements from "Car Wash" by Rose Royce 
Track 17 contains elements from "Single Life" by Cameo

Chart history

References

External links

Personal Business by Bad Azz on iTunes

2001 albums
Bad Azz (rapper) albums
Priority Records albums
Albums produced by Fredwreck
Albums produced by JellyRoll
Albums produced by Big Hollis
Albums produced by L.T. Hutton
Albums produced by Battlecat (producer)